The Tawleed horse breed was developed in the Khartoum region of Sudan. This breed was formed by breeding native horses with an exotic breed. Tawleed horses are used as riding horses and they are known for their resistance to heat and drought. There are no pedigrees or bloodlines currently available for this breed.

Horse breeds
Animal breeds originating in Sudan